Didehban castle is a historical castle located in Bastak County in Hormozgan Province.

References 

Castles in Iran